The Anguilla Statistics Department, subject to the Statistics Act of 2000, reports to the Minister charged with responsibility for the subject of Statistics; the Head of the Department is referred to as the Statistician also designated as the Chief Statistician. It was created mainly to facilitate the development of a statistical system for Anguilla which is also a component of both the regional statistical systems of CARICOM and OECS, together with other member countries of these two regional institutions.

Mission
As stated by the Statistics Law, the mission of the Anguilla Statistics Department is:
 to collect, compile, analyses abstract and publish statistical information relative to the commercial, industrial, social, economic and general activities and conditions of the people who are the inhabitants of Anguilla:
 to collaborate with all other departments of Government and with local authorities in the collection, computation and publication of statistical records of administration;
 to take any census in Anguilla; and
 generally to organize a coordinated scheme of social and economic statistics and intelligence pertaining to Anguilla;
The Law lists matters the Statistics department shall collect statistics on, with prior approval of the Governor in Council.

Organisation
Under the Chief Statistician authority, the Department activities are distributed according to the following areas:
Economic Statistics
Social Statistics
Tourism and International Trade Statistics 
Administration

History
{| class="wikitable"
|+ Previous heads of the Statistics department
! width=300 | Name
! width=100 | Period
|-
|Ms Penny Hope-Ross  
|   
|}

See also
Sub-national autonomous statistical services
United Nations Statistics Division

External links
Ministry of Finance, Economic Development, Investments & Tourism
Anguilla Statistics Department
Anguilla statistics indicators on CARICOM Statical indicators publication
Anguilla statistical system on United Nations Statistics Division website
CARICOM Statistics
OECS Statistics

References

Official statistics
Anguilla